Cordón de Puntas Negras is a  volcanic chain located east of the Salar de Atacama in Chile's Antofagasta Region.

Puntas Negras runs from the Chiliques volcano on the north to volcán Puntas Negras almost to the SE. The Puntas Negras Volcano forms the common endpoint of two chains of volcanoes in a V-shaped configuration. The southern leg of the V is called "Cordón Chalviri" whose other extreme is the Cerro Tuyajto, SW of Puntas Negras and at the same distance SE of the Miñiques volcano. Several small volcanic centres and lava flows are found here, including Aguas Calientes, Cerros Cenizas, Chinchilla and Laguna Escondida which have well preserved craters. The volcanic chain is associated with a topographic anomaly in the region, a property that other volcanoes in the area also have.

Rocks in the chain are andesite, basaltic andesite and dacite containing biotite, hornblende and pyroxene. Magmas from this volcanic chain have a calc-alkaline composition formed by partial melting of a mantle wedge, with research indicating a decrease in SiO2 concentration over time. In the Tuyajto group, past fumarolic activity has bleached the volcanic rocks in the summit region.

The basement beneath the chain is composed from Ordovician marine sediments that were later deformed by the Acadian orogeny. The  La Pacana caldera is buried beneath Puntas Negras. Both the 3.2 ± 0.3 Patao ignimbrite and the 2.4 ± 0.4 mya Pampa Chamaca or Tuyajto ignimbrite from La Pacana may have been erupted from beneath Puntas Negras. the Tuyajto ignimbrite is 530,000 ± 170,000 years old.

Biotites in andesitic lavas have been dated 0.7 ± 0.3 to 0.3 ± 0.2 million years ago. Volcan Puntas Negras has generated postglacial lava flows  and a  large lava dome west of Puntas Negras may be of Holocene age. An olivine basalt flow from the northern part of the chain extends over  towards Salar el Laco and may be of late Holocene age. The youngest volcanic centre appears to be located southeast of Laguna Escondida. Historical eruptions may have occurred in the Chalviri chain. A zone of anomalous electrical conductivity down to depths of  extends north to Lascar volcano. Cerro Overo at the southeastern end of Puntas Negras has been undergoing active deformation, with a previously observed pattern of subsidence before 2003–2005 switching to a pattern of inflation. Filling and emptying of a magma reservoir linked to Puntas Negras may be the cause for these deformation patterns.

The volcanic chain forms a water divide in the Andes, separating the Puna de Atacama from the basins Laguna Miscanti and Laguna Miniques. Puntas Negras has been affected by glaciation during the Pleistocene, with moraines reaching up to  altitude. Possibly, the entire chain was covered with glaciers, and certainly the southern part where several sets of moraines and glacial trimlines have been identified. Water from Cordón de Puntas Negras is a principal water source for Laguna Miscanti.

See also
 List of volcanoes in Chile
 Acamarachi
 El Laco
 Miscanti

References 

Volcanoes of Antofagasta Region
Mountains of Chile
Stratovolcanoes of Chile